1. Club für Rasenspiele Pforzheim 1896 e.V., commonly known as 1. CfR Pforzheim is a football club based in Pforzheim, Germany. The club play in the Oberliga Baden-Württemberg, which is the fifth tier of football in the country.

History
On 3 July 2010. The club was formed, when the two local rivals 1. FC Pforzheim and VfR Pforzheim merged to form 1. CfR

Of the two clubs, 1. FC Pforzheim had been the more successful side, even making a losing appearance in the German football championship final in 1906. In the more recent past, the club had won a championship in the then tier-three Oberliga Baden-Württemberg in 1991. Since 2004, 1. FCP had mainly been playing in the Verbandsliga Nordbaden, where it won a league title in 2006. It was this league place, the new club inherited, entering the Verbandsliga from 2010 onwards. The club also claims 1896, the formation year of 1. FCP, as its historical founding date.

VfR Pforzheim had spent most of its history in the shadow of 1. FC Pforzheim. The two clubs last encountered each other in the Oberliga Baden-Württemberg for three seasons from 1992 to 1995. VfR finished runners-up in this league in 1994–95 but, missing out on promotion, decided to withdraw to lower amateur league football for financial reasons. The club's final two seasons were spent in the tier eight Kreisliga Pforzheim, before it merged with its rival.

In its inaugural season, 2010–11, the club finished seventh in the Verbandsliga Baden and had set its aim for the 2011–12 season to finishing in the top five of the league.

In 2014, it came only seventh but finished runners-up in the league the season after and qualified for the promotion round to the Oberliga. It defeated Radolfzell and SV Göppingen to win Oberliga promotion.

Stadium

The club has played its home games at the Stadion im Brötzinger Tal is a stadium in Pforzheim, Germany. The stadium has a capacity of 10,000 people all seater. The club originally favoured the Holzhof as its permanent home ground but was unable to obtain permission from the local council to develop the ground because of its location in a protected zone.

Players

Current squad

Personnel

References

External links
 

1. FC Pforzheim
2010 establishments in Germany
Association football clubs established in 2010
Football clubs in Germany
Football clubs in Baden-Württemberg